Roundhay is a ward in the metropolitan borough of the City of Leeds, West Yorkshire, England.  It contains 50 listed buildings that are recorded in the National Heritage List for England.  Of these, one is listed at Grade II*, the middle of the three grades, and the others are at Grade II, the lowest grade.  The ward is to the northeast of the centre of Leeds, and includes the suburbs of Roundhay, Gledhow, and Oakwood.  The ward is mainly residential, and most of the listed buildings are houses, cottages and associated structures, farmhouses and farm buildings.  The other listed buildings include an open-air bath, a bridge, schools, a hotel, churches and a gravestone in a churchyard, a folly, a row of almshouses, a hospital, a drinking fountain, a shop, and a clock tower.


Key

Buildings

References

Citations

Sources

 

Lists of listed buildings in West Yorkshire